Total Reality is a 1997 American action and science-fiction film directed by Phillip J. Roth. The musical score was composed by Jim Goodwin. The film stars David Bradley, Ely Pouget, Thomas Kretschmann, Anna Nicholas, Marcus Aurelius, and Patsy Pease.

Plot
In 2107 Earth is controlled by a military-political party known as the Bridgists. A galaxy-wide rebellion against the Bridgists' rule results in the destruction of all life on Earth. Soon, the rebellion is on the brink of defeat by the Bridgists. The rebels make a final stand near Proximia 2 in the Alpha Centauri star system. The rebels win a starship battle with the Bridgists, but the Bridgist Commander Tunis and Colonel Norris escape in a time traveling shuttle which takes them back to Earth in 1998. The rebels destroy the Bridgist ship, even though it is filled with civilians. Rebel lieutenant Anthony Rand tries to stop the destruction of the Bridgist ship, but instead ends up killing his own commander. He is arrested and sent to military prison.

Rand and 3 other prisoners, Wingate, Frankel, and Uriah, are recruited to go back in time to 1998 and kill Commander Tunis. They have 48 hours to complete their mission, otherwise their bio-implants will self-destruct, killing them all.

Rand and the others successfully land in America in 1998. Rand’s group steals a car and Uriah is able to drive it. Cathy Easton, a businesswoman from 1998, breaks into her ex-husband's house and finds Commander Tunis and Colonel Norris there. Rand’s group reaches the house and starts shooting at Tunis. Uriah is killed and Tunis escapes. Tunis then blows up the house, but Rand manages to rescue Cathy. FBI agents arrive at the house to investigate the explosion. Finding Uriah’s body, the agents try to conduct a postmortem, but Uriah’s bio-implant blows up.

Rand’s group returns to Cathy’s house, where she tells Rand that she was married to a John Bridges; Rand knows he started the Bridgist movement through a book on political idealism he wrote. Rand surmises that is why Tunis has travelled back to 1998. The police arrive, so Rand blows up the house and they all escape in the explosion.

Wingate receives a signal from Tunis and Norris’s bio-trackers from inside an old warehouse. Frankel finds the bio-trackers in a wooden chest as Tunis and Norris have managed to remove them. Unfortunately, as soon as Frankel opens the chest, they self-destruct, killing him.

John Bridges is nearly killed in an explosion, and Cathy becomes the main suspect. The police turn up, and Rand and Wingate help Cathy escape. Rand sends Cathy back to their ship, and goes on alone with Cathy to catch Tunis.

Congressman Jerry meets up with John Bridges to talk about his book. Jerry is running for Senate next year and he needs additional support. Jerry blackmails John about his tax debts and money laundering to get his support.

Rand and Cathy go and visit John Bridges, as Rand knows that Tunis may be near. They take out the security guards and confront John. Rand is about to kill John, but Cathy persuades him not to. Instead, they go in search of Congressman Jerry.

However, Tunis finds Jerry first and kidnaps him. Tunis plans to replicate himself into the image of Jerry, so he can run for president. Rand and Cathy find Tunis, and they have a gunfight. Jerry is killed, potentially changing the future forever, and Tunis manages to escape taking Cathy as a hostage. Rand finds them on a bridge, and kills Tunis. Cathy escapes by jumping over the side of the bridge into the river and Rand follows. Meanwhile Wingate gets back to the ship and takes off, leaving Rand stuck in 1998.

Rand’s bio-implant blows up as his 48-hour mission time has come to an end. Cathy is arrested by the FBI and tries to explain that she is innocent and that Rand and Tunis came from the future. They believe her and all charges are dropped.

Wingate returns to the future, but all the space stations have disappeared. Her ship is picked up by another large space cruiser which has come from Earth. In this new reality, there has been no war and Earth was never destroyed.

Cast
 David Bradley as Anthony Rand, a rebel lieutenant
 Ely Pouget as Cathy Easton, a businesswoman and ex-wife of John Bridges from 1998
 Thomas Kretschmann as Commander Tunis, a Bridgist commander
 Misa Koprova as Wingate, a rebel prisoner
 Brian Faker as Frankel, a rebel prisoner 
 Melik Malkasian as Uriah, a rebel prisoner
 Geof Prysirr as Congressman Jerry as the next president of the United States
 Michael Mendelson as John Bridges, Cathy’s ex-husband and author of the political idealist books
 Anna Nicholas as Agent Wesson, an FBI agent from 1998
 Marcus Aurelius as Agent Smith, an FBI agent from 1998
 Bob Morrisey as Major Prackel
 Mark McClure as Dr. Gordon
 Patsy Pease as Leader
 Ken Olandt as Commander Swift
 Eddi Wilde as Colonel Norris, a Brigist Colonel
 Mark Angelo as a guard

References

External links
 
 

1990s English-language films
1997 films
1990s science fiction action films
American science fiction action films
Films set in 1998
Films set in the 2100s
Films set in the 22nd century
Films about time travel
Alternate timeline films
Films shot in Portland, Oregon
Fiction set in the 2100s
Films directed by Phillip J. Roth
1990s American films